Burgess Hill East is an electoral division of West Sussex in the United Kingdom, and returns one member to sit on West Sussex County Council.

Extent
The division covers the eastern half of the town of Burgess Hill and came into existence as the result of a boundary review recommended by the Boundary Committee for England, the results of which were accepted by the Electoral Commission in March 2009.

It comprises the following Mid Sussex District wards: Burgess Hill Franklands Ward, the southern part of Burgess Hill Meeds Ward and Burgess Hill St. Andrews Ward; and of the eastern part of the civil parish of Burgess Hill.

Election results

2013 Election
Results of the election held on 2 May 2013:

2009 Election
Results of the election held on 4 June 2009:

References
Election Results - West Sussex County Council

External links
 West Sussex County Council
 Election Maps

Electoral Divisions of West Sussex
Burgess Hill